Moqanak (also Romanized as Moqānak, Moghānak, Mīqānak, Mowkanak, Mukanak, and Muqanak) is a village in Chuqur Rural District, Tarom Sofla District, Qazvin County, Qazvin Province, Iran. At the 2006 census, its population was 57, in 20 families.

References 

Populated places in Qazvin County